The 2022 Women's European Water Polo Championship was the 19th running of the tournament. It was held in the Spaladium Arena in Split, Croatia from 27 August to 10 September 2022.

Spain won their third title by defeating Greece in the final, while Italy captured the bronze medal with a win over the Netherlands.

Venues
LEN announced on 28 August 2020 that Split, Croatia would host the 2022 edition of the competition. All games were played at the Spaladium Arena.

Qualification

Twelve teams were able to compete at the main event. They were broken up as follows:

 The host nation
 The top five teams from the 2020 European Championship not already qualified as host nation
 Final six from the qualifiers.

Russia was excluded due to the 2022 Russian invasion of Ukraine.

Format
The twelve teams were split in two groups with six teams each. From there on, a knockout system was used. The first four teams of each group played each other in the quarterfinals in cross group format, the remaining teams played for places nine to twelve.

Draw
The draw was held in Budapest on 23 April 2022.

Preliminary round
All times are local (UTC+2).

Group A

Group B

Placement games

Eleventh place game

Ninth place game

Knockout stage

Bracket

Quarterfinals

5–8th place bracket

5–8th place semifinals

Seventh place game

Fifth place game

Semifinals

Third place game

Final

Final standings

Awards and statistics

Top goalscorers

Awards
The awards were announced on 9 September 2022.

References

External links
Official website

Men
Women's European Water Polo Championship
International water polo competitions hosted by Croatia
Women's European Water Polo Championship
European Water Polo Championship
European Water Polo Championship
European Water Polo Championship